Bagh-e Amir Bekandeh (also Romanized as Bāgh-e Amīr Bekandeh; also known as Bag and Bāgh) is a village in Hajji Bekandeh-ye Koshk-e Bijar Rural District in Khoshk-e Bijar District of Rasht County, Gilan Province, Iran. At the 2006 census, its population was 575, in 187 families.

References 

Populated places in Rasht County